Hydra Ventures is an investment and business development firm that creates and develops new consumer brands in the apparel, footwear and sports-related areas. It is basically formed as a venture capital fund but has the full backing of Adidas. The managing director is Tom Montgomery, who was formerly head of corporate strategy at Adidas. Besides Adidas CEO Herbert Hainer and Adidas CFO Robin Stalker, the board includes Duncan Fitzwilliams, founder of Nash Fitzwilliams, and Toby Hoare, CEO of JWT Europe.

In 2018, Hydra Ventures participated in a health and wellness company, Keyto's $2.5m seed funding round. The funding will allow expanding research and development of its smart breath sensor that detects when the body is in ketosis.

References

External links
 

Venture capital firms of Germany